Argyrios Vouzas was a Greek revolutionary and doctor of the 19th and 20th centuries.

Biography 
Vouzas was born in 1857 in Kastoria, then Ottoman Empire (now Greece). He studied at a Greek school of Kastoria, at a Monastir high school and later graduated in medicine from the University of Athens. He became a doctor, acting in the areas of Kastoria and Florina. He soon became a member of the so-called "New Filiki Etaireia", established by Anastasios Pichion in 1867. His actions were discovered by the Ottoman authorities, which lead to his imprisonment in Monastir. When he was released, he assisted the Macedonian Committee as a military doctor. During the First Balkan War he was appointed as a director of a 150-bed military hospital. Shortly after, in 1914, he volunteered for the Autonomous Republic of Northern Epirus.

References 

1857 births
Year of death unknown
People from Kastoria
Greek Macedonians
Greek people of the Macedonian Struggle
Greek military doctors
National and Kapodistrian University of Athens alumni
Greek military personnel of the Balkan Wars
Northern Epirus independence activists
Emigrants from the Ottoman Empire to Greece